John Francis Maclean Morrison  (born 27 August 1947 in Wellington) is a former New Zealand cricketer who played 17 Tests and 18 One Day Internationals for New Zealand. From 1998 to 2013, he was a Wellington City Councillor; his political career ended when he stood for mayor only.

Cricket career
A dogged right-handed opening batsman, Morrison was also known for his occasional left-arm spin bowling, including his 'mystery' delivery. After several seasons of moderate performances in domestic cricket he hit 180 not out (which remained his highest first-class score) for Wellington against Northern Districts at Wellington in 1972–73, and was selected for the next season's tour of Australia. In the three-Test series he was the leading run-scorer on either side, with 249 at an average of 41.50. He hit 117, his only Test century, in the Second Test at Sydney. He never regained that Test form, although he did enough to be selected in the International Wanderers XI tour of South Africa in 1975–76.

His best first-class bowling came for Wellington against Auckland at Auckland in 1977–78, when he took 5 for 69 in Auckland's second innings and followed up with 106 to lead a run chase which ended with Wellington losing by four runs.

Local-body politics 
Since retiring from playing he has worked as a commentator and in local politics, including serving on the Wellington City Council for the Western Ward since 1998. As councilor, Morrison worked to bring an Aussie Rules match to Wellington. A match was held on Anzac Day 2013 between St Kilda and the Sydney Swans. Shortly afterwards Morrison and businessman John Dow brokered a deal with Australian firm CallActive to bring "300 to 500" call-centre jobs to Wellington.

In May 2013, Morrison announced his candidacy for the Wellington mayoralty at the 2013 local elections. He was unsuccessful in challenging incumbent mayor Celia Wade-Brown, meaning that he was no longer on Wellington City Council, as he had contested the mayoralty only.

In July 2019, a new centre-right political party, the Wellington Party, announced candidates for the 2019 local government elections would include Morrison. However, he did not appear on the final list of candidates.

Other roles 
After finishing as a Wellington City Councillor in 2013, Morrison took on a role as CallActive's business development manager but left before the centre went into liquidation in 2015.

Honours and awards
In the 2009 Queen's Birthday Honours, Morrison was appointed a Member of the New Zealand Order of Merit, for services to cricket and the community.

References

External links 
 Wellington City Council website profile

1947 births
Central Districts cricketers
Cricketers at the 1975 Cricket World Cup
Cricketers at the 1979 Cricket World Cup
Living people
Members of the New Zealand Order of Merit
New Zealand cricketers
New Zealand One Day International cricketers
New Zealand Test cricketers
Wellington cricketers
Taranaki cricketers
Wellington City Councillors
New Zealand sportsperson-politicians
North Island cricketers